Cyperus hensii is a species of sedge that is native to parts of central Africa.

The species was first formally described by the botanist Charles Baron Clarke in 1896.

See also
 List of Cyperus species

References

hensii
Taxa named by Charles Baron Clarke
Plants described in 1896
Flora of Angola
Flora of Zambia
Flora of the Democratic Republic of the Congo
Flora of the Republic of the Congo